Reggie Dewayne Stephens (born February 21, 1975 in Shreveport, LA) is a former American football cornerback in the National Football League and in the Arena Football League. Also, a rapper, music producer, and founder of the Reggie Stephens Foundation.

Early life
Stephens was born in Shreveport, Louisiana, and at age 15 moved to Santa Cruz, California.
Stephens attended and played High school football at Santa Cruz High School with Brendan Ayanbadejo. Stephens also competed in the boys 100 and 200 meter dash, long jump, and 400 meter relay at Santa Cruz High. Stephens is now listed in the Santa Cruz High School Athletics Hall of Fame for his achievements in these sports.

College career
Stephens graduated from Santa Cruz High, and went on to play football at Cabrillo Junior College in Aptos, California. Stephens then got accepted to Rutgers University in New Brunswick, New Jersey. Stephens won the Homer Hazel MVP Award, in 1998 his senior year at Rutgers University. Reggie was also 1st Team All Big East Sporting News, and played in the East West Shrine Game in 1998 at Stanford Stadium.

Professional career
Stephens played for the NFL's New York Giants between 1999 and 2003 and in 25 games and had 3 interceptions and three kickoff returns for 69 yards. In 2005 and 2006, he played for the AFL's Nashville Kats. Reggie Stephens also made it to Super Bowl XXXV where the Baltimore Ravens defeated the New York Giants 34-7, January 28, 2001 at Raymond James Stadium in Tampa, Florida.

Coaching
Stephens coaches High School Varsity Football for the Scott's Valley Falcons. He specializes in coaching Wide Receivers, Cornerbacks, and Defensive Backs alongside head coach Louie Walters. Reggie has coached the Falcon's to win the SCCAL four years in a row, 2006-2009.

Reggie Stephens Foundation
Stephens created a non-profit organization, named the Reggie Stephens Foundation, dedicated to helping the youth of Santa Cruz and the Central Coast of California, based on his own childhood experiences. The RSF (Reggie Stephens Foundation) mission statement says "a strong work ethic, hard work, good grades, good sportsmanship, and a positive attitude can get you far in life." RSF seeks volunteering and funding, to help kids get involved in sports, arts and crafts, and entertainment. Louie Walters, head coach of the Scott's Valley Falcons, is on the board of directors for the RSF. The RSF also hosts an annual golf tournament at Delaveaga Golf Course.

Personal life
Stephens now lives in Santa Cruz, California. He has two kids.

External links
 Arena Football League page
 http://www.reggiestephens.org
 https://www.famouzplacements.com

1975 births
Living people
Players of American football from Dallas
African-American players of American football
American football cornerbacks
Rutgers Scarlet Knights football players
New York Giants players
Nashville Kats players
Cabrillo Seahawks football players
Santa Cruz High School alumni
21st-century African-American sportspeople
20th-century African-American sportspeople